Busobya is a village in the Kamuli District of Uganda. In June 2005 it was announced that its Bugulumbya Secondary School was to become the first Nepad e-school.

Populated places in Eastern Region, Uganda
Kamuli District